Hypsodontinae is an extinct subfamily of Bovidae. They are considered the earliest members of the family, first appearing in the earliest part of the Miocene. The group may be diphyletic in relation to other members of the family.

References

Bovidae
Mammal subfamilies
Prehistoric mammals